Each national team have to submit a squad of 23 players, three of whom must be goalkeepers. If a player is injured or ill severely enough to prevent her participation in the tournament before her team's first match, she can be replaced by another player. The squad list must be published no later than 10 days before the tournaments opening match.

Age, caps, goals and clubs are correct as of 16 July 2017.

Group A

Belgium
The squad was announced on 25 June 2017.

Head coach: Ives Serneels

Denmark
The squad was announced on 19 June 2017.

Head coach: Nils Nielsen

Netherlands
The squad was announced on 14 June 2017.

Head coach: Sarina Wiegman

Norway
The squad was announced on 28 June 2017.

Head coach: Martin Sjögren

Group B

Germany
A 29-player squad was announced on 10 May 2017. The final squad was revealed on 30 June 2017.

Head coach: Steffi Jones

Italy
A 30-player squad was announced on 19 June 2017. The final squad was released on 5 July 2017.

Head coach: Antonio Cabrini

Russia
The squad was announced on 29 June 2017.

Head coach: Elena Fomina

Sweden
The squad was announced on 20 June 2017.

Head coach: Pia Sundhage

Group C

Austria
The squad was announced on 1 July 2017.

Head coach: Dominik Thalhammer

France
The squad was announced on 30 May 2017.

Head coach: Olivier Echouafni

Iceland
The squad was announced on 22 June 2017.

Head coach: Freyr Alexandersson

Switzerland
The squad was announced on 3 July 2017.

Head coach:  Martina Voss-Tecklenburg

Group D

England
The squad was announced on 3 April 2017.

Head coach:  Mark Sampson

Portugal
The squad was announced on 6 July 2017.

Head coach: Francisco Neto

Scotland
The squad was announced on 27 June 2017.

Head coach:  Anna Signeul

Spain
The squad was announced on 20 June 2017.

Head coach: Jorge Vilda

Statistics

Player representation by league system

Note: One player is unattached.

References

External links

Squads
2017